Lars Jungnickel (born 31 August 1981) is a German former professional footballer. Early in his career, he played as a forward and later as a midfielder, most notably for Dynamo Dresden.

Career
Jungnickel was born in Dohna, East Germany. He had two spells with Dynamo Dresden. He first joined the club as a child in 1987, and made his debut in the Regionalliga Nordost twelve years later. He spent two seasons in Dynamo's first-team, playing as a striker, and despite the club's relegation to, and subsequent failure to get promoted from, the NOFV-Oberliga, he showed promise, and in July 2001 he earned a move to Energie Cottbus of the Bundesliga, along with teammate Silvio Schröter.

Jungnickel only made three appearances in his first season with Cottbus – his debut came in March 2003 when he replaced Thomas Reichenberger in a 2–0 win over Schalke 04 – but made 23 appearances, mostly as a substitute, the next year, as the team finished bottom of the league. He missed much of the following season, but featured more regularly in the next two 2. Bundesliga seasons, the latter of which saw the club promoted in third place. Back in the Bundesliga, Jungnickel only saw 20 minutes of action all season, and was released by Cottbus in July 2007.

Jungnickel then returned to Dynamo Dresden, now in the Regionalliga Nord, and helped the club qualify for the 3. Liga in his first season back. He has been a regular first-team player at the club ever since, usually employed as a defensive midfielder. He helped Dynamo earn promotion to the 2. Bundesliga in 2011, but missed most of the following season, due to injury. He retired at the end of the 2012–13 season, in which he had not made any first-team appearances.

Jungnickel was named in Germany's squad for the 2001 FIFA World Youth Championship, and won four caps for the under-21 team in 2002, scoring one goal.

Career statistics

References

External links

1981 births
Living people
People from Dohna
German footballers
Footballers from Saxony
Association football forwards
Association football midfielders
Germany under-21 international footballers
Germany youth international footballers
Dynamo Dresden players
Dynamo Dresden II players
FC Energie Cottbus players
Bundesliga players
2. Bundesliga players
3. Liga players